Daryl Guppy (顾比) is an Australian financial columnist and author of books on stock market trading techniques. He has spoken at conferences and appeared on finance television programs. He invented Guppy Multiple Moving Averages (GMMA), which is included in the MetaStock and other charting programs. He writes weekly columns for The Edge, China Daily and Shanghai Security News and a CNBC.com column – Charting Asia. He appears frequently on CNBC Asia. He has his own trading website, guppytraders.com, founded in 1996, which, among other things, provides education, training, and analysis for both personal and financial market traders.

He has spoken in 27 countries and frequently speaks at all of Australia's stock exchanges. He has published 8 books, including one on the Chinese stock market. He was one of only two foreigners who spoke at the 2005 China market outlook conference in Beijing, and the keynote speaker for the 2007 China Capital Markets Investment Forum.

He lives in Darwin, Northern Territory, over 3000 km away from the nearest stock exchange.

Bibliography
 The 36 Strategies of the Chinese for Financial Traders
 Trend Trading
 Share Trading
 Chart Trading
 Trading Tactics
 Better Trading
 Snapshot Trading
 Bear Trading

References

External links
 Guppy Traders.com

Australian stock traders
Australian financial writers
Living people
Year of birth missing (living people)